The 2016 European Table Tennis Championships were held in Budapest, Hungary from 18–23 October 2016. The competition was held at Tüskecsarnok.

Medal summary

Men's events

Women's events

Mixed events

Medal table

References

 
2016
European Championships
International sports competitions in Budapest
Table Tennis European Championships
2010s in Budapest
October 2016 sports events in Europe
Table tennis competitions in Hungary